Dahiru Yahaya (30 June 1947 – 3 February 2021) was a Nigerian academic, educator and historian, who was professor of History, and head of History Department In Bayero University, Kano.

Early life and education 
Dahiru was born in Kano Nigeria, He received a Bachelor of Arts degree in History at Abdullahi Bayero College, which is now Ahmadu Bello University Zaria in 1970 and a Doctor of Philosophy degree (Diplomatic History) at the University of Birmingham United Kingdom in 1975.

Career
He started working as a Social Welfare Assistant under the Northern Regional Government in Kaduna, he also worked as the Administrative Officer under Kano State Government, Dahiru joined at the Department of History Faculty of Arts and Islamic Studies Bayero University, Kano in 1970 where he worked throughout his life.

Death
He died on Wednesday 3 February 2021 after a brief illness in Kano State, Nigeria.

References

Academic staff of Bayero University Kano
1947 births
2021 deaths
People from Kano
People from Kano State
Ahmadu Bello University alumni
Alumni of the University of Birmingham